The 2021 Internazionali di Tennis Città di Forlì was a professional tennis tournament played on clay courts. It was the second edition of the tournament which was part of the 2021 ATP Challenger Tour. It took place in Forlì, Italy between 14 and 20 June 2021.

Singles main-draw entrants

Seeds

 1 Rankings as of 31 May 2021.

Other entrants
The following players received wildcards into the singles main draw:
  Jacopo Berrettini
  Flavio Cobolli
  Francesco Passaro

The following player received entry into the singles main draw using a protected ranking:
  Viktor Galović

The following players received entry into the singles main draw as alternates:
  Raúl Brancaccio
  Orlando Luz

The following players received entry from the qualifying draw:
  Sebastian Fanselow
  Francesco Forti
  Lucas Gerch
  Thiago Agustín Tirante

Champions

Singles

 Mats Moraing def.  Quentin Halys 3–6, 6–1, 7–5.

Doubles

  Sergio Galdós /  Orlando Luz def.  Pedro Cachín /  Camilo Ugo Carabelli 7–5, 2–6, [10–8].

References

Internazionali di Tennis Città di Forlì
Internazionali di Tennis Città di Forlì
June 2021 sports events in Italy
Internazionali di Tennis Città di Forlì